Zaeem Navid is a Pakistani politician who had been a member of the Provincial Assembly of the Punjab, from 2008 to May 2018 and member of Lahore Gymkhana Club.

Early life and education
He was born on 25 December 1964 in Lahore.

He has the degree  of LL. B. the Bachelor of Laws  which he obtained in 1988 from Quaid-e-Azam Law College and a degree of the Master of Business Administration where he received in 1991 from Canadian School of Management Sciences.

He is husband of Uzma Qadri.

Political career
He was jailed in 2006 for a brief period of time due to his protest on Jyllands-Posten Muhammad cartoons controversy.

He was elected to the Provincial Assembly of the Punjab as a candidate of Pakistan Muslim League (N) (PML-N) from Constituency PP-154 (Lahore-XIII) in by-polls held in June 2008. He received 8,211 votes.

He was re-elected to the Provincial Assembly of the Punjab as a candidate of PML-N from Constituency PP-154 (Lahore-XIII) in 2013 Pakistani general election. In November 2016, he was inducted into the provincial Punjab cabinet of Chief Minister Shehbaz Sharif and was made Provincial Minister of Punjab for Auqaf and Religious Affairs.

In June 2018, he quit PML-N and announced to contest 2018 general election as an independent candidate.

References

1964 births
Living people
Punjabi people
Pakistani prisoners and detainees
Punjab MPAs 2008–2013
Punjab MPAs 2013–2018
Pakistan Muslim League (N) MPAs (Punjab)
People from Lahore
People associated with the Jyllands-Posten Muhammad cartoons controversy